Stara Rawa  is a village in the administrative district of Gmina Nowy Kawęczyn, within Skierniewice County, Łódź Voivodeship, in central Poland.

In 2004 the village had a population of 280.

The village, as the town of Rawa, was founded probably in the 11th century.

References

External links
Stara Rawa in (Polish)

Stara Rawa